SVT24, stylized as svt24, formerly known as SVT 24 (then stylized svt 24) or 24 is a Swedish language TV channel broadcast by Sveriges Television (SVT). It started broadcasting in 1999 as a dedicated news channel. In 2003 it extended its scope to include other current events-related programmes and sports at the weekend. Nowadays the channel mainly consists of news, sports and entertainment programmes with a focus on reruns from SVT1 and SVT2.

History
On 15 March 1999 at 13:15 the broadcasting of SVT24 started. It started with a news summary followed by an official opening by the CEO of SVT. In the beginning, SVT24 simulcasted with other channels a lot of the time, first on SVT2 and in the summer on SVT1. SVT24 got to take care of extended broadcasts in case of special events.

The channel broadcast news every fifteen minutes throughout the weekday. However, there were no broadcasts in the weekends and the nightly broadcasts started some months later. At :00 and :30 SVT24 showed longer bulletins, but the :15 and :45 broadcasts were just news summaries. The channel also broadcast economic news twice every hour, many weather forecasts, reports from the Nordic countries and other featured stories. The material was mostly picked up from other news programmes.

SVT24 used digital technology for broadcasting, so a bulletin from SVT24 was much cheaper to broadcast than a bulletin from Rapport or Aktuellt. That's why during 1999 and 2000 SVT24 took over all the short bulletins from Rapport and the morning programme was moved to the SVT24 studio. In 2000 SVT24 merged with Rapport and Aktuellt into one central newsdesk. After some time, the channel was hit by cost savings. All broadcasts between 09:30 and 16:00 ceased for some time and the economic news disappeared.

On 8 September 2001, Aktuellt and Rapport moved to a new common studio and got a graphical make-over. That meant that all bulletins in SVT1 got the Rapport brand, making SVT24 only broadcasting digitally (and on SVT1 in the nights). SVT24 moved into the common studio a week later. In the end of 2002 SVT declared that they were going to launch two new channels. That meant that SVT24 was about to be merged with SVT Extra into a new channel, called only 24. 24 would include a wider range of programmes than SVT24 did, also including acquired programming, sports events and weekend broadcasts.

The new channel was launched on 24 February 2003. It consisted of short three-minute bulletins from Rapport every half-hour. Between these many different programs were shown. In the day-time this consisted of 24 Direkt ("24 Live", Swedish version of C-SPAN), 24 Måndag-Fredag ("24 Monday-Friday") and reruns of the evening programmes. The prime time show at 20:00 was 24 minuter ("24 minutes"), a daily chat show hosted by Claes Elfsberg. Other prime time shows included 24 Nöje ("24 Entertainment"), 24 Konsument ("24 Consumer"), Sverige Nu ("Sweden Now") and acquired programming such as Saturday Night Live, documentaries and World News from BBC World. During the weekends, the "interactive news service" 24 Vision and sport events where shown.

In the autumn of 2003 the channel was hit by cost savings. The short bulletins were now only shown every hour in the daytime and 24 Direkt started occupying the rest of the day-time schedule. New shows included a taped radio show, Lantz i P3. In 2004 the acquired programming and BBC World disappeared. 24 Konsument and 24 Nöje were however transformed into daily newscasts and sport bulletins were included in the evening.

In 2005, the simulcasts of Rapport at 19:30 and Aktuellt at 18:00 and 21:00 ended and were replaced by mostly reruns of current affairs-based programmes from SVT1 and SVT2. 24 Konsument was axed in late 2005 and in 2006 24 Nöje rebranded as Nöjesnytt with bulletins on both SVT1 (in the morning) and SVT2 (in the evening). On 1 July 2005 SVT24, along with SVT Barnkanalen and Kunskapskanalen became must-carry channels and SVT and UR subsequently agreed to let the said channels be distributed on UPC Sweden and Com Hem cable television systems in their basic analogue range.

The ratings for the channel had been very modest from the start. 2006 did however mean a significant increase in the viewing. For the full year of 2005 the average Swede watched SVT24 for 0.7 minutes per day. For the month of November 2006 this had doubled to 1.4 minutes. The next month, December 2006, the rating doubled once again, averaging 2.8 minutes per day and viewer, for the first time making SVT24 one of the ten most watched channels in Sweden. (Source: Mediamätning i Skandinavien)

In December 2006, the daily current affairs show Studio 24 got axed because of budget cuts at the SVT news department. Sverige Nu was also axed. The channel relaunched in January 2007. The new evening schedule mainly consists of reruns of programmes from SVT1 and SVT2 and a half-hour news bulletin from Rapport with Nöjesnytt at 21:30. 24 Direkt, the sports broadcasts and news updates were retained. On 18 January 2010 Kunskapskanalen began sharing channel space with SVT24 and SVT Barnkanalen, and at the same time 24 Direkt was renamed SVT Forum and shifted to Kunskapskanalen. Under the current arrangement SVT24 is aired from 20:00 until 05:00 the next day, with SVT Barnkanalen and Kunskapskanalen occupying the morning, afternoon and early-evening slots. On 25 November 2013 SVT announced its intention to launch a high-definition (HD) simulcast of SVT24.

Name
The channel started out as SVT24, and as SVT 24 on 8 September 2001, but was renamed 24 in 2003. This name was however hard to use, so variants such as 24:an ("the 24") occurred along with the old name. About a year later the name SVT24 started to appear in EPGs and programme schedules.

Logos and identities

Distribution
The channel is broadcast free-to-air in the digital terrestrial television network in Sweden and Åland. Satellite transmissions are from the Thor and Sirius satellites, but are encrypted. A decoding card from Viasat or Canal Digital is needed to view the channel. The two largest cable networks (Com Hem and UPC) broadcast the analogue version of the channel.

References

External links
  

Television channels in Sweden
24-hour television news channels
24
1999 establishments in Sweden
Television channels and stations established in 1999